Kaptanganj is a constituency of the Uttar Pradesh Legislative Assembly covering the city of Kaptanganj in the Basti district of Uttar Pradesh, India.

Kaptanganj is one of five assembly constituencies in the Basti Lok Sabha constituency. Since 2008, this assembly constituency is numbered 308 amongst 403 constituencies.

Members of Legislative Assembly

Election results

2022

2017

This seat belonged to Bharatiya Janta Party candidate Chandra Prakash Shukla who won in last Assembly election of 2017 Uttar Pradesh Legislative Elections defeating Bahujan Samaj Party candidate Ram Prasad Chaudhary by a margin of 6,827 votes.

16th Vidhan Sabha: 2012 General Elections

References

External links
 https://www.expressmorning.online/2021/07/kaptanganj.html

External links
 

Assembly constituencies of Uttar Pradesh
Basti district